Sporting Suceava was a professional football club from Romania, based in Suceava and founded in 2008.

History
Sporting Suceava, with Ovidiu Ciobanu on the bench, promoted to the 3rd league after a successful campaign in 2010–11 season, "the white and greens" won the Liga IV – Suceava County and promotion play-off against the champion of Mureș County, FCM Târgu Mureș II, with 2–1 after extra time. The squad that achieved the promotion was composed of: Butnariu – Pantea, Murariu, Sevaciuc, Oniu, Bosancu, Apetri, Nicoară, Căinari, Guriță, Negru. Reserves: Gălan, Crișu, Gliga, Buziuc, Jalba, Avrămia, Cerlincă.

After three season in Liga III, the club was dissolved in the summer of 2014.

Honours
Liga IV – Suceava County:
Winners (1): 2010–11

League history

References

External links 
Official website

Association football clubs established in 2008
Association football clubs disestablished in 2014
Defunct football clubs in Romania
Football clubs in Suceava County
Liga III clubs
2008 establishments in Romania
2014 disestablishments in Romania